Josh Reynolds may refer to:

Josh Reynolds (American football) (born 1995), American football wide receiver
Josh Reynolds (rugby league) (born 1989), Australian rugby league player
Josh Reynolds (rugby union) (born 1998), Welsh rugby union player

See also
Sir Joshua Reynolds (1723–1792), English artist
Statue of Joshua Reynolds, London